Fiona Pitt-Kethley (born 21 November 1954) is a British poet, novelist, travel writer and journalist, who is the author of more than 20 books of both poetry and prose. She lived for many years in Hastings, East Sussex, and moved to Spain in 2002 with her husband James Plaskett and their son, Alexander.

Her collection of poetry Sky Ray Lolly was published in 1986. She has been described as a poet in "the new tradition of British sexiness in verse that Ewart helped to inaugurate".

Pitt-Kethley has also worked as a freelance journalist and has written for The Daily Telegraph, The Independent, The Guardian, The Times, The Big Issue and others.

Bibliography

Poetry collections

 Sky Ray Lolly (1986)
 Private Parts (1987)
 The Perfect Man (1989)
 Dogs (1993) (Includes two pieces of journalism)
 Double Act (1996)
 Memo From a  Muse (1997)
 Selected Poems (2008)

Novels
 The Misfortunes of Nigel (1991)
 Baker's Dozen (2000)

Travel writing
 Journeys to the Underworld (1988)
 The Pan Principle (1994)
 Red Light Districts of the World (2000)

Collected journalism
 Too Hot to Handle (1992)

Autobiography
 The Autobiography of Fiona Pitt-Kethley: My Schooling (2000)

Anthologies as editor
 Literary Companion to Sex: an Anthology of Prose and Poetry (1994)
 Literary Companion to Low Life (1995)

References

1954 births
Living people
British journalists
20th-century English novelists
British travel writers
British women travel writers
English women poets
English women novelists
20th-century English women writers